The FIS Snowboarding World Championships 1997 took place between January 21 and January 26 in Innichen, Italy.

Results

Men's results

Snowboard Cross

Giant Slalom

Parallel Slalom

Slalom

Halfpipe

Women's Events

Snowboard Cross

Giant Slalom

Parallel Slalom

Slalom

Halfpipe

Medal table

References

1997
1997 in Italian sport
1997 in snowboarding